Villamassargia, Bidda Matzràxia, Bidda Massàrgia (agrarian town) in sardinian language,  is a comune (municipality) in the Province of South Sardinia in the Italian region Sardinia, located about  west of Cagliari and about  northeast of Carbonia.

Villamassargia borders the following municipalities: Domusnovas, Iglesias, Musei, Narcao, Siliqua.

References

Cities and towns in Sardinia